Bush is an unincorporated community in Thurston County, in the U.S. state of Washington. The community is east of the Olympia Regional Airport and southeast of the city of Tumwater.

History
The community was named after George Washington Bush, a pioneer settler.

Parks and recreation
Bush is directly south of Tumwater's Pioneer Park. Three small lakes, Munn Lake, Susan Lake, and Trails End, lie within or near the community.

References

Unincorporated communities in Thurston County, Washington